Aldea is a Spanish word meaning "hamlet". It may refer to:

People
Alexander I Aldea (1397–1436), Prince of Wallachia
Aurel Aldea (1887–1949), Romanian general and anti-communist resistance leader
Bogdan Aldea (born 1981), Romanian football player
Dan Andrei Aldea (1950–2020), Romanian rock multi-instrumentalist
José Antonio Rodríguez Aldea (1779–1841), Chilean politician
Juan de Dios Aldea (1853–1879), Chilean sailor
Ramón Aldea (born 1932), Filipino archer

Places

Antarctica
Aldea Island, one of the Bugge Islands off the Antarctic Peninsula

Argentina
Aldea Apeleg, a village and municipality in Chubut Province
Aldea Asunción, a village and municipality in Entre Ríos Province
Aldea Beleiro, a village and municipality in Chubut Province
Aldea Epulef, a village and municipality in Chubut Province
Aldea Escolar, a village and municipality in Chubut Province
Aldea Protestante, a village in Entre Ríos Province
Aldea Salto, a village in Entre Rios Province
Aldea San Antonio, a village in Entre Rios Province
Aldea San Francisco, a village in Entre Rios Province
Aldea San Juan, a village in Entre Rios Province
Aldea Spatzenkutter, a municipality in Entre Ríos Province
Aldea Valle María, a municipality in Entre Ríos Province

Chile
Aldea Island, in the Campana Archipelago of southern Chile
Puerto Aldea, a village near Tongoy, Elqui Province, Coquimbo Region

Mexico
La Aldea, a community in Silao, Guanajuato

Romania
Aldea, a village in Mărtiniș Commune, Harghita County

Spain
Aldea de El Quejigal, a village Albacete Province, Castile-La Mancha
Aldea de Fuente Carrasca, a village in Albacete Province, Castile-La Mancha
Aldea de San Miguel, a municipality in Valladolid Province, Castile and León
Aldea de Las Hoyas, a village in Albacete Province, Castile-La Mancha
Aldea de Mesones, a village in Albacete Province, Castile-La Mancha
Aldea de Pinilla, a village in Albacete Province, Castile-La Mancha
Aldea del Cano, a municipality in Cáceres Province, Extremadura
Aldea del Fresno, a municipality in the Commune of Madrid
Aldea del Pinar, a village in Burgos Province, Castilla y León
Aldea del Rey, a municipality in Ciudad Real Province, Castile-La Mancha
Aldea en Cabo, a municipality Toledo Province, Castile-La Mancha
L'Aldea, a municipality in Catalonia
La Aldea de San Nicolás, a village on Gran Canaria
La Aldea del Obispo, a municipality in Cáceres Province, Extremadura

Ships
 Chilean destroyer Aldea (1928), a destroyer of Chilean Navy, (1928–1967)
 Chilean tug Aldea (ATF-63), an ocean tug of the Chilean Navy, formerly USS Arikara (1943–1992)
 Chilean ship Sargento Aldea (LSDH-91), an amphibious assault ship of the Chilean Navy, formerly the French ship Foudre (1988–)

Other
An aldea is an administrative division in Honduras
Aldea Tic, a Colombian TV show hosted by Uribe DJ
Aldeas Infantiles SOS, Spanish for SOS Children's Villages, an international development organisation
Autódromo Aldea Romana, a motorsports circuit Buenos Aires, Argentina
Sargento Aldea, a station on the Valparaíso Metro in Chile
Aldea, a fictional planet in Star Trek: The Next Generation (episode 1.17: "When the Bough Breaks")

Spanish feminine given names